János Ferencsik (18 January 190712 June 1984) was a Hungarian conductor.

Ferencsik was born in Budapest; he actively played music even as a very young boy. He took violin lessons and taught himself to play the organ. He studied at the National Conservatory of Music in Budapest, where his major subjects were organ performance and composition. He joined the Budapest State Opera at the age of twenty, where he was engaged as a rehearsal coach. In this capacity he took part in the Bayreuth Festival in 1930-31.

At Bayreuth, he assisted Arturo Toscanini, an experience which was to be of decisive importance for the remainder of his career. Between the two world wars, he studied in Budapest under such conductors as Arturo Toscanini, Bruno Walter, Felix Weingartner and Wilhelm Furtwängler.

Ferencsik's international career began in 1937. By the end of the 1930s, he became one of the Hungarian Opera's leading conductors. He conducted the farewell concert of Béla Bartók and Ditta Pásztory-Bartók  in 1940 in Budapest, just before Bartók had left the continent. His artistic career came to full fruition after 1945, as he was appointed General Music Director of the Budapest Opera, Principal Conductor of the Hungarian National Philharmonic Orchestra in Budapest and, from 1960 until 1967, and the Conductor Chairman of the Budapest Philharmonic Orchestra. From 1948 until 1950, Ferencsik was principal guest conductor of the Vienna State Opera, he was guest conductor of the Los Angeles Philharmonic, and toured widely abroad, conducting on every continent with the exception of Africa,

Ferencsik was a friend of Hungarian composers László Lajtha, Béla Bartók and Zoltán Kodály and was known for his interpretations of their works. Among his many recordings are two of Kodály's Székelyfonó. Notable students include Alexander Raichev.

Media
 Bartók: Divertimento, Hungarian State Orchestra, 1984.

References

Sources
 Liner note with recording of Beethoven's Symphonies Nos 1 and 7, Hungarian Philharmonic Orchestra, on LaserLight 15 904.
 Szabolcsi Bence - Tóth Aladár: Zenei lexikon, Zeneműkiadó Vállalat, 1965. I. k. 616. o. "Ferencsik János"
 VÁRNAI PÉTER: Interview with János Ferencsik,  ZENEMŰKIADÓ BUDAPEST 1972

External links
 [ Biography], allmusic.com; accessed 6 November 2016.
 Obituary, nytimes.com; accessed 6 November 2016.
 František Sláma archive, frantisekslama.com; accessed 6 November 2016.

Hungarian conductors (music)
Male conductors (music)
Musicians from Budapest
1907 births
1984 deaths
20th-century conductors (music)
Artists of Merit of the Hungarian People's Republic
Burials at Farkasréti Cemetery
20th-century Hungarian male musicians